The 2004 Florida Atlantic University Owls football team represented Florida Atlantic University in the 2004 NCAA Division I-AA football season. The team was coached by Howard Schnellenberger and played their home games at Lockhart Stadium in Fort Lauderdale, Florida.

Schedule

Game summaries

at Hawaii

References

Florida Atlantic
Florida Atlantic Owls football seasons
Florida Atlantic Owls football